= Antonio Simone =

Italian pianist, composer, and recording artist

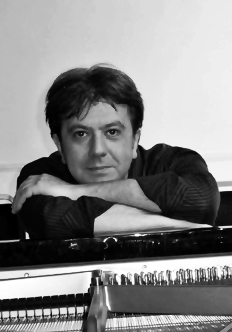

Background information
- Born: 1969 (age 56–57); Italy
- Genres: Neoclassical New Age
- Occupations: Pianist, composer, recording artist
- Instrument: Piano
- Years active: 1989–present
- Label: Indie
- Website: AntonioSimone.info

Antonio Simone (born 1969) is an Italian pianist, composer and recording artist. He shifted from a classical musical style to a neoclassical new age style in the early 21st Century with albums such as Life Colours.

== Discography ==
- Life Colours (2010)
- Step by Step (2012)
- Piano Collection Vol. 1 (2012)
- Nothing Lasts Forever (2014)

== Awards and nominations ==
Year	Awards	Result	Category	City/Country
2011	The People's Music Awards	Won	Folk/Jazz/Classical/World Music	London, UK
2012	Hollywood Music in Media Awards	Nominated	Classical	Los Angeles, CA, US
2012	Hollywood Music in Media Awards	Nominated	New Age/Ambient	Los Angeles, CA, US
